Mitsubishi UFJ NICOS Co., Ltd., formerly name Nippon Shinpan, is a Japanese company. It was established in 1951 and became Japan's first and largest credit company during the post-World War Japanese economic boom.

Now part with Mitsubishi UFJ Financial Group.

Shareholders
Mitsubishi UFJ Financial Group (85%)
Norinchukin Bank (15%)

See also
The Bank of Tokyo-Mitsubishi UFJ
Visa Inc.
MasterCard
China UnionPay
Edy

References

External links
Mitsubishi UFJ NICOS

Financial services companies established in 1951
1951 establishments in Japan
Companies formerly listed on the Tokyo Stock Exchange
Companies formerly listed on the Hong Kong Stock Exchange
Midori-kai
Financial services companies based in Tokyo
Mitsubishi companies
Mitsubishi UFJ Financial Group